Þorsteinn Löve (29 July 1923 – 10 April 2002) was an Icelandic athlete. He competed in the men's discus throw at the 1952 Summer Olympics.

References

1923 births
2002 deaths
Athletes (track and field) at the 1952 Summer Olympics
Thorsteinn Löve
Thorsteinn Löve
Place of birth missing